Tienen is a city and municipality in the province of Flemish Brabant, in Flanders, Belgium. The municipality comprises Tienen itself and the towns of Bost, Goetsenhoven, Hakendover, Kumtich, Oorbeek, Oplinter, Sint-Margriete-Houtem and Vissenaken.

On 1 January 2017, Tienen had a total population of 34,365.

History

In the early Middle Ages, the town was probably ruled by an old German family Thienen.

During the 1635 to 1659 Franco-Spanish War, Tienen was part of the Spanish Netherlands and was captured by a combined Franco-Dutch army in May 1635. Its capture resulted in one of the most serious atrocities of the Dutch Revolt; the town was sacked, over 200 civilians killed and many buildings damaged, including Catholic churches and monasteries. This ended Dutch prospects of winning over the predominantly Catholic population of the Southern Netherlands.

After the 1714 Treaty of Utrecht, the town was incorporated into the Austrian Netherlands; in the French Revolutionary Wars, it was used as a base by French Republican General Charles François Dumouriez during the Battle of Neerwinden. On 16 March 1793, the French repulsed an Austrian army commanded by Prince Josias of Coburg.

This was the last victory for the veteran Dumouriez, hero of Valmy and Jemappes; within a week, his army suffered such catastrophic defeats that he defected to the French Royalists.

Economy
Tienen is the centre of sugar production in Belgium; a huge sugar beet processing factory, the Sugar refinery of Tienen (Tiense Suikerraffinaderij - Raffinerie Tirlemontoise), is located at the eastern edge of the town. It is the site of facilities owned by Citrique Belge, that produces citric acid, and Havells Sylvania, a manufacturer of energy saving lamps.

Culture and significant landmarks
Tienen is the location of a summer rock festival known as 'Suikerrock'.

The Sint-Germanus (St. Germain) Church dates from the 12th century and has an altarpiece by the 19th-century painter Gustaaf Wappers. Its belfry has earned that complex a designation on the UNESCO World Heritage Site list of Belfries of Belgium and France.

The principal church, Onze-Lieve-Vrouw-ten-Poel (Our Lady of the Pool), was begun in the 12th and enlarged in the 15th century; it remains unfinished.

Transport
The town is served by Tienen railway station, the oldest in Belgium still in use.

Notable inhabitants
 Beatrijs of Nazareth (1200–1268), Flemish mystic
 André Vandewyer (1909–1992), Belgian footballer and coach
 Matthias Vanden Gheyn (1721–1785), composer, organist, and carillonist
 Linguist Herman Liebaers (1919–2010), was born in Tienen.
 Louis Michel (b. 1947), politician
 Luc van Acker (b. 1961), Belgian musician and producer

International relations

Twin towns—Sister cities
Tienen is twinned with:
  Bielsko-Biała, Poland

References

Sources

External links

 Official website - Only available in Dutch
 tienen.info - All news from Tienen, only available in Dutch
 Suikerrock

 
Municipalities of Flemish Brabant